Belize competed at the 1984 Summer Olympics in Los Angeles, United States. The nation returned to the Olympic Games after participating in the American-led boycott of the 1980 Summer Olympics. This was the first Olympic participation for Belize as an independent country. Eleven competitors, all men, took part in seven events in three sports.

Athletics

Men
Track & road events

Boxing

Cycling

Six cyclists represented Belize in 1984

Men

References

External links
Official Olympic Reports

Nations at the 1984 Summer Olympics
1984
Summer Olympics